aka Torasan Goes to Hisbiscus Land is a 1980 Japanese comedy film directed by Yoji Yamada. It stars Kiyoshi Atsumi as Torajirō Kuruma (Tora-san), and Ruriko Asaoka as his love interest or "Madonna". Tora's Tropical Fever is the twenty-fifth entry in the popular, long-running Otoko wa Tsurai yo series.

Shochiku theatrically released a Special Edition version to theaters in 1997. It used computer graphics to add Hidetaka Yoshioka (who played Tora-san's nephew in the later films) to the story in added scenes.

Plot
Lily, the lounge singer with whom Tora-san fell in love in film 11 (Tora-san's Forget Me Not, 1973) and film 15 (Tora-san's Rise and Fall, 1975) sends Tora-san a letter informing him that she is terminally ill. Tora-san rushes to Okinawa—taking his first plane trip in the process—to be at her side and nurse her to health.

Cast
 Kiyoshi Atsumi as Torajirō
 Chieko Baisho as Sakura
 Ruriko Asaoka as Lily
 Masami Shimojō as Kuruma Tatsuzō
 Chieko Misaki as Tsune Kuruma (Torajiro's aunt)
 Gin Maeda as Hiroshi Suwa
 Hisao Dazai as Boss (Umetarō Katsura)
 Hayato Nakamura as Mitsuo Suwa
 Gajirō Satō as Genkō
 Suzuko Aragaki as Kaori Yamazato

Critical appraisal
Writer-director Yoji Yamada reportedly considers Tora's Tropical Fever his own favorite of the Otoko wa Tsurai yo series films. The Japan Academy awarded Yamada and co-writer Yoshitaka Asama Best Screenplay for the film. Chieko Baisho was also given the Best Actress award, and Kiyoshi Atsumi was nominated for Best Actor at the ceremony. The German-language site molodezhnaja gives Tora's Tropical Fever four out of five stars, naming it one of the highlights of the series. Stuart Galbraith IV judges the film "one of the best of the series", and a "delight in every respect: it's funny, sad, and perceptive about human nature".

Availability
Tora-san's Tropical Fever was released theatrically on August 2, 1980. In Japan, the film was released on videotape in 1996 and 1998, and in DVD format in 2008.

References

Bibliography

English

German

Japanese

External links
 Tora's Tropical Fever at www.tora-san.jp (official site)

1980 films
Films directed by Yoji Yamada
1980 comedy films
1980s Japanese-language films
Otoko wa Tsurai yo films
Japanese sequel films
Shochiku films
Films with screenplays by Yôji Yamada
Films set in Okinawa Prefecture
1980s Japanese films